The NESkimos is an independent American video game music cover band from St. Augustine, Florida.  It is known for songs based on video game music, and covers of songs from popular television shows and movies.

The name is a portmanteau combining the initials of the Nintendo Entertainment System (NES) with the word Eskimos. This is a nod both to the practice of third-wave ska bands in the early 1990s fabricating band names that somehow involve the word "ska" and to the DOS-based Nintendo emulator NESticle, which the band's founder Dr. Wily credits as giving him the idea to cover NES music.

It is a video game cover band that, rather than try and recreate songs note-for-note, opt to artistically explore and expand upon the songs they cover, via creating additional parts (such as their cover of Grape Garden from Kirby's Adventure) or creating lyrics (such as their cover of Norfair from Metroid). The NESkimos have gained a following on their web forums (fans refer to themselves as NESkimites), and they allow fans to download all their music, for free, from their website.  They perform in clubs throughout the Southeast United States, and have made appearances at MAGfest and PAX (Penny Arcade Expo).

History
The NESkimos were formed in St. Augustine, Florida in 2002 by founding members Dr. Wily (guitar), Mario (drums), and Simon Belmont (bass).

The NESkimos dissolved in 2007 after their last performance at PAX '07. Their lineup at the time was Dr. Wily, Johntendo (guitar), and Dylan (bass). Their drums had been programmed after the departure of Mario from the band in 2006.

A reunion took place from 2012 to 2016, which saw the NESkimos return to live performances at video game conventions in the southeast United States. No further albums were released during their reunion, however the band released two new song demos to fans in 2013 through their forums. Their final performance was at MAGLabs in 2016.

Lineup

The band members prefer not to go by their real names, and instead have adopted internet personae based on videogame icons.
Dr. Wily - guitar, vocals
Bruce Wayne - guitar, vocals
Dylan, the Third Double Dragon - bass
Mario - drums

Previous members
Johntendo - guitar
Simon Belmont - bass
The Dog from Duck Hunt aka Trevor Belmont - bass

A few songs also feature guitar solos from The Shredder, and one song features Napalm Man on alto saxophone.

Discography
Due to legal reasons, the NESkimos have not released any form of CD, but instead release all their songs in MP3 format on the Internet, and provide album artwork.
Battle - Perfect Selection (2002)
Bloodshed (2003)
Berserker (2004)
Balance (unfinished)

See also
Video game music culture

References

External links
Official NESkimos Website, with forum.
ForGreatJustice.org, official Fansite
An interview with NESkimos lead guitarist/vocalist, Dr. Wily
Article from the World Series of Videogames

Video game music cover bands
Nintendocore musical groups
Musical groups from Florida
Musical groups established in 2002
Musical groups disestablished in 2008
2002 establishments in Florida
Musical groups reestablished in 2012